John Hammond (15 January 1769 – 15 October 1844) was an English cricketer of the late 18th and early 19th century.  He was one of the greatest early Sussex players.

Hammond made his known debut in the 1790 season and played in 123 first-class cricket matches to the 1816 season. A genuine all-rounder, he was a left-handed batsman but he bowled right-arm slow underarm. He was a good fielder and an occasional wicket-keeper.
 
Hammond played for the Players in the inaugural and second Gentlemen v Players matches in 1806. His son, Charles, played first-class cricket, as did his grandson Ernest Hammond.

References

1769 births
1844 deaths
English cricketers
English cricketers of 1787 to 1825
Players cricketers
Brighton cricketers
Surrey cricketers
Marylebone Cricket Club cricketers
Kent cricketers
East Kent cricketers
Middlesex cricketers
Hampshire cricketers
Non-international England cricketers
People from Pulborough
Homerton Cricket Club cricketers
Colonel C. Lennox's XI cricketers
R. Leigh's XI cricketers
Lord Frederick Beauclerk's XI cricketers
George Osbaldeston's XI cricketers
Lord Yarmouth's XI cricketers
T. Mellish's XI cricketers